Ann Louise Aiken (born December 29, 1951) is an American attorney and jurist in the state of Oregon. A native Oregonian, she has served as a state court judge of the Oregon circuit courts and worked in private legal practice. She is currently a United States district judge of the United States District Court for the District of Oregon. She served as Chief Judge of the Court from February 1, 2009 to January 31, 2016.

Early years

Aiken was born in Salem, Oregon, on December 29, 1951. In 1974, she graduated from the University of Oregon with a Bachelor of Science degree, and then from Rutgers University in New Jersey in 1976 with a Master of Arts degree. Aiken returned to Oregon and graduated with a Juris Doctor in 1979 from the University of Oregon School of Law. After law school, she worked as a law clerk for Judge Edwin Allen of the Lane County Circuit Court from 1979 to 1980.

Career

She entered private legal practice in 1980 and remained there until 1982. In 1982, Aiken worked as a fundraiser and field staffer for Ted Kulongoski's unsuccessful campaign for Governor of Oregon in 1982, and then worked as the chief clerk of the Oregon House of Representatives from 1982 to 1983. Aiken returned to private practice that year and remained there until she became a district judge in Lane County in 1988. Based in Eugene, she then became an Oregon circuit court judge in 1992 for Lane County, remaining on the bench until 1997.

Federal judicial service

President Bill Clinton nominated her to a seat on the United States District Court for the District of Oregon vacated by James A. Redden in November 1995, and again on January 7, 1997. Aiken was confirmed by the United States Senate on January 28, 1998, receiving her commission on February 4, 1998. On February 1, 2009, she became Chief Judge of the Court, the first woman to hold that position in the District of Oregon  She served in that capacity until January 31, 2016.

Decisions

On September 26, 2007, Judge Aiken declared unconstitutional two portions of the USA PATRIOT Act that deal with the government's power to conduct certain surveillance without first obtaining a warrant. The decision received national attention and came in the case of the Brandon Mayfield lawsuit against the federal government for false detainment following the 2004 Madrid train bombings, in which Mayfield was uninvolved in the bombings. In the decision, Aiken held that those provisions of the Foreign Intelligence Surveillance Act violate the Fourth Amendment to the United States Constitution.

On October 7, 2015, Judge Aiken resentenced Dwight L. Hammond and his son Steven D. Hammond to five years in prison with credit for time served for federal arson, the mandatory minimum for that crime. The Hammonds had illegally set fires on their ranch which burned  of federal land. U.S. District Judge Michael R. Hogan had sentenced the Hammonds to 3 months and 1 year in prison respectively, but Judge Aiken ruled that the minimum sentences must be followed. Armed militiamen led by Ammon Bundy occupied the Malheur Wildlife Refuge near the Hammonds' ranch in protest of the ruling, demanding that the Hammonds be released and that the hundred-year-old wildlife refuge be given over to local control.  The defendants in the case were granted a full Presidential pardon by President Donald J. Trump on July 10, 2018.

Judge Aiken made a key decision in the case Juliana v. United States, a suit brought by 21 youths against the U.S. government stating their rights to a clean environment were violated due to actions that the government had taken. While several similar suits at state and federal level had been dismissed, Judge Aiken instead was compelled by the argument that access to a clean environment was a fundamental right, allowing the case to proceed. This decision was reversed by the United States Court of Appeals for the Ninth Circuit.

Personal

In 1978, Aiken married James Klonoski, a political science professor at the University of Oregon and one-time chair of the Democratic Party of Oregon. Klonoski died in January 2009. They had five children together.

See also
List of first women lawyers and judges in Oregon

References

External links

1951 births
Living people
Judges of the United States District Court for the District of Oregon
Oregon state court judges
Politicians from Salem, Oregon
Rutgers University alumni
South Salem High School alumni
United States district court judges appointed by Bill Clinton
University of Oregon alumni
University of Oregon School of Law alumni
Lawyers from Salem, Oregon
20th-century American judges
21st-century American judges
20th-century American women judges
21st-century American women judges